Merv Smith or Mervyn Smith may refer to:

Merv Smith (footballer) (1924–1977), Australian rules footballer
Merv Smith (broadcaster) (1933–2018), New Zealand radio personality
Mervyn Ashmore Smith (1904–1994), Australian painter